Navin Patel is a Fiji Indian businessman and politician. He held the Ba Indian Communal seat in the House of Representatives for the National Federation Party (NFP) from 1977 to 1987. For the 1987 election, he switched to the North Central Indian National Constituency which he also won easily, but stayed in Parliament for only a further one month before the military coup of 1987 ended his political career. His brother, Vinod Patel, later held the Ba Indian Communal seat for the NFP.

References 

National Federation Party politicians
Indian members of the House of Representatives (Fiji)
Living people
Year of birth missing (living people)
Fijian Hindus
Fijian businesspeople
Politicians from Ba (town)